Saquisilí Canton is a canton of Ecuador, located in the Cotopaxi Province.  Its capital is the town of Saquisilí.  Its population at the 2001 census was 20,815.

Demographics
Ethnic groups as of the Ecuadorian census of 2010:
Mestizo  50.7%
Indigenous  47.4%
Afro-Ecuadorian  0.9%
White  0.7%
Montubio  0.3%
Other  0.0%

References

Cantons of Cotopaxi Province